Syllepte amissalis is a moth in the family Crambidae. It was described by Achille Guenée in 1854. It is found in Brazil.

References

Moths described in 1854
amissalis
Moths of South America